This is a list of ecoregions in Azerbaijan.

Terrestrial ecoregions
Azerbaijan is in the Palearctic realm. Ecoregions are listed by biome.

Temperate broadleaf and mixed forests
 Caspian Hyrcanian mixed forests
 Caucasus mixed forests

Temperate grasslands, savannas, and shrublands
 Eastern Anatolian montane steppe

Deserts and xeric shrublands
 Azerbaijan shrub desert and steppe

Freshwater ecoregions
 Caspian Marine
 Kura - South Caspian Drainages
 Western Caspian Drainages

References

 
ecoregions
Azerbaijan